Siyaruwa is a village in the Jagdishpur block of Bhojpur district in Bihar, India. In 2011 its population was 3,146 in 488 households. It is southeast of the city of Jagdishpur.

References 

Villages in Bhojpur district, India